The 1895 Cup is a British rugby league competition for clubs in the Rugby League Championships.

History
There have been many cup competitions for the lower leagues of rugby league. In 2002 the Championship Cup was founded for Championship and League 1 clubs to compete in along with the Challenge Cup, with the aim to give the lower league clubs a competition they can realistically win.

The Championship Cup folded in 2013 in anticipation for the 2015 league restructuring. There was no replacement for Championship clubs, though the League 1 Cup ran from 2015-2017 for teams from that league.

In late 2018 a new cup competition, named in honour of the founding of the Northern Union in 1895, was put to the Championship and League 1 clubs. It would involve 12 British Championship clubs and four League 1 clubs. It was accepted by the clubs ahead of the 2019 season to be integrated with the new league structure.

For the inaugural 2019 tournament, eight League 1 clubs entered and so a first round was added to reduce these to the four teams required to join the twelve Championship sides in the last-16, followed by a straight knockout tournament to the final at Wembley on 24 August immediately after the 2019 Challenge Cup final. The 2020 competition did not take place due to the COVID-19 pandemic.

With covid-19 still affecting the 2021 season, a new format which merged the early rounds of the tournament with the Challenge Cup was approved. In 2021, the four sides which progressed from the second round of the Challenge Cup qualified for the 1895 Cup semi-finals.  An adapted version of this format was approved for 2022, to reflect the re-expansion of the Challenge Cup to include amateur teams. Now, the five qualifiers - including any amateur teams - from the fifth round of the Challenge Cup would qualify for the 1895 Cup, with any of those teams who win in the sixth round of the Challenge Cup moving straight to the semi-finals of the 1895 Cup. Two of the remaining qualified teams will be drawn into a play-off round before the semi-final stage.

Results

Team Performance

Sponsors
In June 2019 it was announced that the cup would be sponsored by AB Sundecks, owned by former Leigh Centurions chairman Derek Beaumont.

Notes

References 

 
Rugby league competitions in the United Kingdom